The 2019 Washington Open (called the Citi Open for sponsorship reasons) was a tennis tournament played on outdoor hard courts. It was the 51st edition (for the men) and the 9th edition (for the women) of the Washington Open. The event was part of the ATP Tour 500 series of the 2019 ATP Tour, and of the WTA International tournaments of the 2019 WTA Tour. It took place at the William H.G. FitzGerald Tennis Center in Washington, D.C., United States, from July 29 to August 4, 2019.

Points and prize money

Point distribution

Prize money 

1 Qualifiers prize money is also the Round of 64 prize money
* per team

ATP singles main-draw entrants

Seeds

 Rankings are as of July 22, 2019

Other entrants
The following players received wild cards into the main singles draw:
  Christopher Eubanks
  Bjorn Fratangelo
  Tommy Paul
  Jack Sock

The following players received entry from the singles qualifying draw:
  Thai-Son Kwiatkowski
  Marc Polmans
  Brayden Schnur
  Tim Smyczek
  Mikael Torpegaard
  Donald Young

The following players received entry as lucky losers:
  Peter Gojowczyk
  Norbert Gombos
  Ilya Ivashka

Withdrawals
  Kevin Anderson → replaced by  Norbert Gombos
  Tomáš Berdych → replaced by  Marius Copil
  Ugo Humbert → replaced by  Ilya Ivashka
  Gaël Monfils → replaced by  Alexander Bublik
  Kei Nishikori → replaced by  Bradley Klahn
  Sam Querrey → replaced by  Malek Jaziri
  Denis Shapovalov → replaced by  Lloyd Harris
  Bernard Tomic → replaced by  Peter Gojowczyk

ATP doubles main-draw entrants

Seeds

1 Rankings are as of July 22, 2019

Other entrants
The following pairs received wildcards into the doubles main draw:
  Treat Huey /  Denis Kudla 
  Leander Paes /  Jack Sock

The following pair received entry from the doubles qualifying draw:
  Matthew Ebden /  Nicholas Monroe

WTA singles main-draw entrants

Seeds

Rankings are as of July 22, 2019

Other entrants
The following players received wild cards into the main singles draw:
  Hailey Baptiste
  Allie Kiick
  Caty McNally

The following player received entry using a protected ranking into the singles main draw:
  Shelby Rogers

The following players received entry from the qualifying draw:
  Cori Gauff 
  Varvara Gracheva 
  Anna Kalinskaya 
  Sachia Vickery

Withdrawals
Before the tournament
  Bianca Andreescu → replaced by  Lauren Davis
  Belinda Bencic → replaced by  Zarina Diyas
  Margarita Gasparyan → replaced by  Anna Blinkova
  Barbora Strýcová → replaced by  Shelby Rogers
  Vera Zvonareva → replaced by  Kirsten Flipkens

WTA doubles main-draw entrants

Seeds

1 Rankings are as of July 22, 2019

Other entrants
The following pair received a wildcard into the doubles main draw:
  Cori Gauff /  Caty McNally
  Cameron Morra /  Alana Smith

Withdrawals
Before the tournament
  Hayley Carter (medical condition)
During the tournament
  Allie Kiick (ankle injury)

Champions

Men's singles

  Nick Kyrgios def.  Daniil Medvedev, 7−6(8−6), 7−6(7−4)

Women's singles

  Jessica Pegula def.  Camila Giorgi, 6–2, 6–2

Men's doubles

   Raven Klaasen /  Michael Venus def.  Jean-Julien Rojer /  Horia Tecău, 3−6, 6−3, [10−2]

Women's doubles

  Cori Gauff /  Caty McNally def.  Maria Sanchez /  Fanny Stollár, 6–2, 6–2

References

External links
Official website

2019 WTA Tour
2019
2019 in American tennis
2019 in sports in Washington, D.C.
July 2019 sports events in the United States
August 2019 sports events in the United States